A syntractrix is a curve of the form 

It is the locus of a point on the tangent of a tractrix at a constant distance from the point of tangency, as the point of tangency is moved along the curve.

References

Plane curves